Luther Baxter "Bud" Thomas (September 9, 1910 – May 20, 2001), was an American professional baseball pitcher. He played in Major League Baseball (MLB) for the Washington Senators, Philadelphia Athletics, and Detroit Tigers.

Biography

He was born in Faber, Virginia and died in North Garden, Virginia. On April 23, 1939, Thomas surrendered the first major League home run ever hit by Red Sox legend Ted Williams. Thomas pitched to Babe Ruth twice, striking him out the second time.

Although posting only a .120 batting average (18-for-150) in 143 games, Thomas was good defensively. He recorded a .984 fielding percentage with only two errors in 122 total chances in 526 innings pitched.

References

External links

1910 births
2001 deaths
People from Statesboro, Georgia
Major League Baseball pitchers
Baseball players from Virginia
Detroit Tigers players
Washington Senators (1901–1960) players
Philadelphia Athletics players
People from Nelson County, Virginia
Albany Senators players
Atlanta Crackers players
Beaumont Exporters players
Buffalo Bisons (minor league) players
Chattanooga Lookouts players
Wheeling Stogies players
Williamsport Grays players
Youngstown Buckeyes players